This is a list of States and Union Territories of India ranked according to Gross Enrollment Ratio (GER) of students in Classes I to VIII (6–13 yrs). The list is compiled from the Statistics of School Education- 2010–11 Report by Ministry of HRD, Government of India.

List 
Gross enrolment ratio (GER) is a statistical measure used in the education sector and by the UN in its Education Index to determine the number of students enrolled in school at several different grade levels (like elementary, middle school and high school), and examine it to analyze the ratio of the number of students who live in that country to those who qualify for the particular grade level.

Notes

References

States and union territories of India-related lists
Lists of subdivisions of India
India, school enrollment rate